Say Siegel–Schwall is an album by the blues-rock group the Siegel–Schwall Band.  Their second album, it was released in 1967 by Vanguard Records as a vinyl LP.  It was later re-released as a CD, also on the Vanguard label.

Say Siegel–Schwall was the first of two albums by the band to feature Jack Dawson on bass guitar. It was dedicated to Jos Davidson, the previous bassist.

Critical reception

On Allmusic, Cub Coda wrote, "For all parties concerned, this was the group's breakthrough album.... Some of it rocks, some of it boogies, some of it's downright creepy and eerie. Worth seeking out."

Track listing
Side one:
"I'm a King Bee" (Slim Harpo) – 5:29
"Slow Blues in A" (Jim Schwall) – 5:25
"You Don't Love Me" (Schwall) – 2:44
"I.S.P.I. Blues" (Corky Siegel) – 9:51
Side two:
"Bring It With You When You Come" (Traditional; arranged by Jim Schwall) – 4:15
"My Baby Thinks I Don't Love Her" (Siegel) – 4:34
"That's Why I Treat My Baby So Fine" (Siegel) – 11:18
"I Liked It Where We Walked" (Siegel) – 2:56

Personnel

Siegel–Schwall Band
Corky Siegel – harmonica, piano, vocals
Jim Schwall – guitar, mandolin, vocals
Jack Dawson – bass
Russ Chadwick – drums

Production
Samuel Charters – producer
Jules Halfant – design
Joel Brodsky – photography

References

Siegel–Schwall Band albums
1967 albums
Albums produced by Samuel Charters
Albums with cover art by Joel Brodsky
Vanguard Records albums